The International Hotel, often referred to locally as the I-Hotel, was a low-income single-room-occupancy residential hotel in San Francisco, California's Manilatown. It was home to many Asian Americans, specifically a large Filipino American population. Around 1954, the I-Hotel also famously housed in its basement Enrico Banduccci's original "hungry i" nightclub. During the late 60s, real estate corporations proposed plans to demolish the hotel, which would necessitate displacing all of the I-Hotel's elderly tenants.

In response, housing activists, students, community members, and tenants united to protest and resist eviction. All the tenants were evicted on August 4, 1977 and the hotel was demolished in 1981. After the site was purchased by the International Hotel Senior Housing Inc., it was rebuilt and opened in 2005. It now shares spaces with St. Mary's School and Manilatown Center.

History

Residential hotel 
The I-Hotel, originally established as a luxury location for travelers in 1854, relocated to Kearny Street in 1873 and was rebuilt in 1907 after the 1906 San Francisco Earthquake and Fire. During the 1920s and 1930s, thousands of seasonal Asian laborers came to reside at the I-Hotel. The communities and building around the I-Hotel grew into a 10-block Filipino American enclave along Kearny Street known as Manilatown, the Manilatown section of San Francisco. During the 1960s, residents were able to rent a room in the hotel for less than $50 a month.

Urban renewal
During the urban renewal and redevelopment movement of the mid-1960s, the International Hotel was targeted for demolition. This "urban renewal" that occurred in response to the end of World War II had destroyed the heart of the Fillmore District, San Francisco, and hundreds of homes and thousands of residents were displaced due to the city's plans to expand the downtown business sector.

In 1968, Milton Meyer & Co., a real-estate company, issued eviction notices to the I-Hotel tenants, with plans to demolish and replace the I-Hotel with a parking garage. This demolition would happen concurrently with the destruction of ten blocks of low-cost housing, restaurants, barber shops, markets, clubs and other Filipino community businesses.

In October 1973, the Thailand-based Four Seas Investment Corporation bought the I-Hotel with the similar intentions to replace it with more profitable building or structure.

Resistance and eviction
For years after the first eviction notices were served in 1968, many individuals were involved in the long fight that took place on the streets, in courtrooms, and in the everyday lives of the I-Hotel Manilatown residents.

In 1969, tenants and activists successfully negotiated an extended lease from Milton Meyer & Co. To finance this lease, Asian American art workshops Kearny Street Workshop and Jackson Street Gallery, as well as other rent-paying cultural organizations and businesses such as Everybody's Bookstore, moved into the basement of the I-Hotel. However, in 1974, tenants received eviction notices from Four Seas Investment Corporation, forcing community organizers to revise their plans to resist eviction.

Community poet and historian Al Robles played a key role in organizing the broad coalition of protesters, as did International Hotel Tenant Association chairperson Emil deGuzman and tenants Wahat Tampao and Felix Ayson. Ed Lee volunteered for the cause by working through the terms of various anti-eviction agreements as an attorney for the Asian Legal Caucus. Asian American student activists from nearby University of California, Berkeley and San Francisco State University also joined the protests, volunteering to repair and repaint the I-Hotel so that it remained habitable for tenants even as the Four Seas Investment Corporation failed to maintain basic utilities.

Controversial Peoples Temple leader Jim Jones also became involved in the fight for the I-Hotel. After Jones was appointed as Chairman of the San Francisco Housing Authority Commission, the Housing Authority voted to acquire the building using $1.3 million in federal funds and then to turn it over to tenants rights groups.

When a court rejected that plan and ordered evictions in January 1977, the Peoples Temple provided two thousand of the five thousand people that surrounded the building, barricaded the doors and chanted "No, no, no evictions!" Sheriff Richard Hongisto, a political ally of Jones, refused to execute the eviction order, which resulted in Hongisto being held in contempt of court and serving five days in his own jail.

In the early morning of August 4, 1977, 400 San Francisco riot police began to physically remove tenants from homes despite the 3,000 protesters attempting to surround and barricade the I-Hotel. Within six hours, all 55 remaining tenants had been evicted. In total, 197 tenants were evicted.

International Hotel Manilatown Center
In 1994, real estate company Pan-Magna sold the I-Hotel land to the Roman Catholic Archdiocese of San Francisco. Subsequently, an $8.3 million grant from the United States Department of Housing and Urban Development was awarded to facilitate development of low-income housing. The Chinatown Community Development Center was chosen to steward this grant.

In 2003, construction began on the new I-Hotel, and the building was completed on August 26, 2005. The new building contains 105 apartments of senior housing. A lottery was held to determine priority for occupancy, with the remaining living residents of the original I-Hotel given priority.

Occupancy started in October 2005, and the new building also contains a ground-floor community center and a historical display commemorating the original I-Hotel. Additionally, a new mural on the site of the new building by Johanna Poethig features Robles, Etta Moon, Bill Sorro, and other tenant activists, commemorating their struggle to preserve affordable housing in San Francisco.

Depictions in popular culture
 The hotel and its elderly Filipino tenants were in a scene in the 1982 indie film Chan Is Missing by Wayne Wang.
 The Fall of the I-Hotel (1983) is a documentary written and directed by Curtis Choy that chronicles the fight for the I-Hotel and its tenants' eviction. The documentary is narrated by Al Robles.
 The Manilatown Series (2005) is a series of documentaries and short films written and directed by Curtis Choy that traces the eventual rebuilding of the I-Hotel.
 I Hotel (2010), a book by Karen Tei Yamashita, uses the I-Hotel as a setting for many of the ten interconnected novellas that comprise the novel.
 "Save the I-Hotel," a short story in author Lysley Tenorio's collection Monstress (2012), features a manong's memories of the I-Hotel prior to eviction.
 Remember the I-Hotel, a play based on Lysley Tenorio's "Save the I-Hotel," was presented by the American Conservatory Theater in November 2015.
 In the sixteenth episode of the fourth season of Barney Miller entitled "Eviction", the plot was loosely based on the events that transpired in the hotel.

See also

 Manilatown
 Kearny Street Workshop
 Kearny Street
 Al Robles
 Asian American movement
 Violeta Marasigan

References

Further reading

External links 

 ihotel photos on Flickr User photographs documenting 30+ years of I-Hotel and its residents
 Manilatown Heritage Foundation, currently on the site of I-Hotel
 The Fall of the I-Hotel, documentary (1983, 2005)
 International Hotel SFGTV San Francisco APA Heritage Month, SFGTV (May 2007)
 International Hotel at the Digital Archaeological Record
 The I-Hotel – San Francisco

Hotels in San Francisco
Filipino-American culture in California
National Register of Historic Places in San Francisco
Hotel buildings on the National Register of Historic Places in California
Hotels established in 1907
Filipino
Filipino-American history
Chinatown, San Francisco
Asian-American issues
1907 establishments in California
1981 disestablishments in California
Buildings and structures demolished in 1981
Demolished buildings and structures in San Francisco